In particle physics, a resonance is the peak located around a certain energy found in differential cross sections of scattering experiments. These peaks are associated with subatomic particles, which include a variety of bosons, quarks and hadrons (such as nucleons, delta baryons or upsilon mesons) and their excitations.

The width of the resonance (Γ) is related to the mean lifetime (τ) of the particle (or its excited state) by the relation

Thus, the lifetime of a particle is the direct inverse of the particle's resonance width. Pions are generally not considered as "resonances". Correspondingly, its resonance width is very large, at 149.1 MeV or about 36 ZHz. This amounts to nearly one-fifth of the particle's rest mass.

See also
Baryon resonance particles
Roper resonance
Giant resonance
Relativistic Breit–Wigner distribution

References

Scattering theory
Particle physics